19 Puppis is a binary star system in the southern constellation of Puppis, near the northern border with Hydra and Monoceros. It is visible to the naked eye as a faint, yellow-hued star with an apparent visual magnitude of 4.72. The system is located approximately 177 light years away from the system based on parallax. It is receding from the Earth with a heliocentric radial velocity of +36 km/s, having come to within  some 1.4 million years ago.

The primary, component A, is an aging giant star with a stellar classification of G9III-IIIb. It is a red clump giant, which indicates it is on the horizontal branch and is generating energy through helium fusion at its core. The star is about one billion years old with 1.05 times the mass of the Sun and 8.9 times the Sun's radius. It is radiating 43 times the luminosity of the Sun from its enlarged photosphere at an effective temperature of 4,750 K.

Four visual companions have been reported. These are component C, at magnitude 13.2 and separation 30.7", D, at magnitude 8.9 and separation 57.8", E, at magnitude 9.37 and separation 70.1", and F, at magnitude 10.74 and separation 114.1".

References

G-type giants
Horizontal-branch stars
Binary stars
Puppis
BD-12 2385
Puppis, 19
068290
040084
3211